Megacyllene lutosa is a rare species of beetle in the family Cerambycidae occurring primarily in the US state of Kansas. It was described by John Lawrence LeConte in 1861.

References

Megacyllene
Beetles described in 1861